FVD may refer to:

 FVD, an automobile engine made by Cosworth
 Fast Virtual Disk, a disk image file format
 Forum voor Democratie (Forum for Democracy), a Dutch political party
 Forward Versatile Disc, a DVD format